The Precipitous Mountains are a mountain range on northern Baffin Island, Nunavut, Canada. It lies in, or near, Sirmilik National Park and is a subrange of the Arctic Cordillera.

See also
List of mountain ranges

References

Arctic Cordillera
Mountain ranges of Baffin Island